Gagata gagata is a species of sisorid catfish found in Bangladesh, Myanmar and India. This species grows to a length of  TL.

References

External links

Sisoridae
Fish of Bangladesh
Fish of Myanmar
Fish of India
Fish described in 1822